Sione's 2: Unfinished Business is a 2012 New Zealand comedy film and the sequel to the hugely successful 2006 film Sione's Wedding. It was produced by John Barnett and Paul Davis, directed by Simon Bennett, co-produced by South Pacific Pictures and New Zealand Film Commission with music by Don McGlashan and written by Oscar Kightley and James Griffin. The film stars Oscar Kightley, Shimpal Lelisi, Robbie Magasiva, Iaheto Ah Hi, Dave Fane, Teuila Blakely, Madeleine Sami, Pua Magasiva, Mario Gaoa, Nathaniel Lees, David Van Horn, Ayşe Tezel, Dimitri Baveas, Kirk Torrance and Te Kohe Tuhaka. Sione's 2: Unfinished Business was filmed at Auckland, New Zealand. The film was theatrically released on 19 January 2012, by Sony Pictures and was released on DVD and Blu-ray on 13 June 2012, by Sony Pictures Home Entertainment. The film has received mixed reviews from critics and has grossed $723,000 in New Zealand. This was Pua Magasiva's final film appearance seven years before his death on 11 May 2019.

Plot
Albert and Tania are now happily married, but cannot quite seal the deal with a baby. While Sefa and Leilani have got two kids, they are not married despite Sefa's proposal. Stanley is now a trainee Deacon in the Future Church, Michael has moved to Australia, and Bolo ditched his job with Sefa's failing business to work for Sione. As adulthood drives them apart, a crisis brings them back together: when Bolo disappears, the Minister gathers up the boys to find him, somewhere, in the world's largest Polynesian city.

Cast
 Oscar Kightley as Albert. Having moved with Tania to Glenfield, he is struggling to find himself away from his friends.
 Shimpal Lelisi as Sefa. He has been engaged to Leilani for five years and has two children but is struggling to connect with her.
 Robbie Magasiva as Michael. He has been living overseas since the first film and returns to his disappointed friends.
 Iaheto Ah Hi as Stanley. He has found religion after embracing a cult like church.
 Dave Fane as Paul
 Teuila Blakely as Leilani
 Madeleine Sami as Tania
 Pua Magasiva as Sione
 Mario Gaoa as Eugene
 Nathaniel Lees as Minister
 David Van Horn as Derek
 Ayşe Tezel as Maria
 Dimitri Baveas as Tony
 Kirk Torrance as Cardinal Hoani
 Te Kohe Tuhaka as Marcel

Production

Development
Writers; Oscar Kightley and James Griffin first proposed a sequel to Sione's Wedding in 2006 but no plans came to fruition. They decided that they wanted to focus on other projects but the idea remained appealing and after rounding up the original cast, the two decided to write the film. Producer John Barnett was always keen on a sequel but Griffin and Kightley needed more time to decide and after toying with several ideas, decided to have the same characters in the same situation, only five years later. As Kightley was friends with the actors and a star of the film himself, the cast spent a lot of time developing the characters. Whilst fundraising for the first film took 4 years, the sequel only took 15 months. In March 2011, it was confirmed that filming was soon to begin on a sequel, titled: "Sione's Wedding II" that was to be released in January 2012. Filming began in April 2011. The cast found filming the sequel to be a lot more fun than it was filming the original, partly as they were comfortable in what they were doing. In April it was confirmed the film was to be written by Griffin and Kightley and may deal with the subject of death.

Filming
The film was shot around Auckland, including areas in Auckland's St Kevins Arcade, Karangahape Rd, Ponsonby Rd and Grey Lynn.

Casting
On 12 March 2011, it was announced that Oscar Kightley would play the lead role in the film, while Shimpal Lelisi, Robbie Magasiva, Iaheto Ah Hi and Dave Fane were in early talks to join the cast. On 13 April, Teuila Blakely, Madeleine Sami, Pua Magasiva, Mario Gaoa, Nathaniel Lees, David Van Horn and Ayşe Tezel were also in final talks to join the film, Dimitri Baveas was added to the cast, playing Tony and on 14 August, Kirk Torrance and Te Kohe Tuhaka joined the cast of the film, playing Cardinal Hoani and Marcel.

Music

Don McGlashan scored the music for the film and on its soundtrack. The soundtrack also contains "I Promise" performed by Savage and Ria, "Gotta Go" performed by Mareko, "Saturday" performed by Home Brew, "Sideline" performed by David Dallas and Che Fu, "Bomb!” performed by PNC, "Say Yeah" performed by P-Money, David Dallas and Aaradhna, "O Le Atua Lava" performed by Mz J and Deacon Kelemete Ta'ale, “Everything” performed by P-Money and Vince Harder, "Music (Makes the World Go Around)” performed by Frisko and Aaradhna, "Too Shy" performed by Devolo, "Them Eyes" performed by Mareko and J Williams, "Wild Out (Chooo Hooo)” performed by Savage, Baby Bash and Angel Dust, "Think You've Got It All" performed by Vince Harder, "This Is Love" performed by Monsta and J Boog and "All The Days" performed by Fredricks Brown.

Release

Marketing
The film's trailer debuted online in July 2011.

Theatrical release
Sione's 2: Unfinished Business was theatrically released on 19 January 2012, by Sony Pictures.

International releases
 New Zealand - 19 January 2012
 Fiji - 26 January 2012
 Australia - 1 March 2012

Home media
Sione's 2: Unfinished Business was released on DVD and Blu-ray on 13 June 2012, by Sony Pictures Home Entertainment.

Reception

Critical response

The film has received mixed reviews, with Steve Kilgallon of stuff.co.nz praising the film's dark but clever plot, the character of Albert and gave the film four stars out of five. Tenani French of View New Zealand also praised the decision to tackle a tougher storyline while maintaining much of the comedic charm of the first film. Russell Baillie of The New Zealand Herald gave the film a negative review, pointing out plot weaknesses and criticising the "cartoonish" feel of the film. However he praised the broad comedy and "conviction" of newcomer Kirk Torrance. Kirk Torrance's character and the Australian siblings were noted by Press reviewer James Croot as the only flaws in a well-written and well-acted illustration of Polynesian life in New Zealand. Dominic Corry of The New Zealand Herald entered the cinema hoping to enjoy the film but found it unsatisfying. Graeme Tuckett of The Dominion Post gave the film a scathing review, calling it "plotless" and awarding it one and a half stars out of five. A review in The National Business Review, criticised the high amount of product placement in the film.

Box office
The film did well commercially, taking in $723,000 over its opening weekend. Thus making it the highest opening weekend of any New Zealand made film.

Awards

Soundtrack

Sione's 2: Unfinished Business: Original Motion Picture Soundtrack is the film's soundtrack album made by Various artists and was released on 10 January 2012, by Universal Music.

Soundtrack list
 Savage feat Ria - I Promise
 Mareko - Gotta Go
 Home Brew - Saturday
 David Dallas feat Che Fu - Sideline
 PNC - Bomb!
 P-Money feat David Dallas and Aaradhna - Say Yeah
 Mz J feat Deacon Kelemete Ta'ale - O Le Atua Lava
 P-Money feat Vince Harder - Everything
 Frisko feat Aaradhna - Music (Makes the World Go Around)
 Devolo - Too Shy
 Mareko feat J Williams - Them Eyes
 Savage feat Baby Bash & Angel Dust - Wild Out (Chooo Hooo)
 Vince Harder - Think You've Got It All
 Monsta feat J Boog - This Is Love
 Fredricks Brown - All The Days

References

External links
 Sione's 2: Unfinished Business trailer on NZ On Screen
 Sione's 2: Unfinished Business at the Internet Movie Database
 Sione's 2: Unfinished Business at AllMovie
 Sione's 2: Unfinished Business at Rotten Tomatoes

New Zealand comedy films
Films set in Auckland
Films shot in New Zealand
2012 comedy films
2012 films
2010s English-language films